is a railway station on Kintetsu Railway's Kyoto Line in the city of Kyōtanabe, Kyoto Prefecture, Japan.

The station is adjacent to a train yard.

Lines
 Kintetsu Railway
 Kyoto Line

Local trains to/from the Karasuma Line subway turn at Shin-Tanabe Station, while express trains go further to Kintetsu Nara Station.

Layout
The station has two platforms serving four tracks.

Platforms

Around the Station
 Kyoto International University
 Tanabe Central Hospital

History

1928 - The station opens as a station of Nara Electric Railroad
1963 - NER merges and the station becomes part of Kintetsu
1988 - The station is elevated
2007 - Starts using PiTaPa

Adjacent stations

References

External links

Official Website

Railway stations in Japan opened in 1928
Railway stations in Kyoto Prefecture